Thomas George Thurber  was a provincial level politician from Alberta, Canada. He was a member of the Legislative Assembly of Alberta from 1989. He was born in Herronton, Alberta.

Political career
Thurber was first elected to the Alberta Legislature in the 1989 Alberta general election. Drayton Valley was abolished in 1993 and reconstituted into Drayton Valley-Calmar. He ran for re-election in the 1993 Alberta general election and won the new riding with an increased plurality. He ran for a third term in office in the 1997 Alberta general election winning the biggest margin of his career defeating three other candidates. In July 1999 Thurber was one of three Alberta MLAs to participate in the Partnership of Parliaments parliamentarian exchange program with Germany. He retired from public politics at dissolution of the legislature in 2001.

References

External links
Legislative Assembly of Alberta Members Listing

Progressive Conservative Association of Alberta MLAs
1934 births
2010 deaths
Members of the Executive Council of Alberta